Fold Your Hands Child, You Walk Like a Peasant is the fourth album from the Scottish group Belle & Sebastian released in 2000.

Recording and production
Stuart Murdoch recalled that this album felt more difficult to make than prior albums. Musically the songs were more complex and "demanded a pop precision that you just couldn’t skirt around" requiring the group to practice and refine things more than they had traditionally.

The band introduced many stylistic changes on this album, such as an organic strings section and more songs with lead vocals by other members of the band; Sarah Martin sings on "Waiting for the Moon to Rise", Isobel Campbell sings on "Family Tree", and performs duets with Stevie Jackson on "Beyond the Sunrise" and Stuart Murdoch on "Women's Realm". Jackson also sings lead vocal on "The Wrong Girl" and duets with Murdoch on "The Model" and "Don't Leave the Light On Baby". It is the last Belle & Sebastian album to feature bass player Stuart David, who departed the band after the album's completion.

The twin sisters pictured on the cover are Icelandic musicians Gyða and Kristín Anna Valtýsdóttir, both from the band Múm.

The album's title comes from a piece of graffiti on a public toilet wall Stuart Murdoch had seen years earlier and remembered.

Reception

The album was released to generally favourable reviews. Fold Your Hands Child, You Walk Like a Peasant debuted at No. 80 on The Billboard 200 and has sold 113,000 copies in the US, according to Nielsen SoundScan. The album's introductory tune, "I Fought in a War" was used for the final credits for the widely acclaimed 2005 documentary about the Military Industrial Complex and 11 September Why We Fight.

The book
Within the album's photography collection are pictures of two books, Beyond the Sunrise and I Fought in a War. Both books are titles of songs on the album, but the books are fictional creations of Murdoch's. Due to the band's interest in literature, fans have tried to locate the books that they believed had "inspired" the songs. Belle & Sebastian have informed fans about the fictive nature of the books on the "Questions and Answers" section of their website.

Track listing

Charts

References

External links
 Album information on belleandsebastian.com (official site) – lyrics, sleeve notes.

2000 albums
Belle and Sebastian albums
Jeepster Records albums